{{Infobox writer 
| name = Kristín Ómarsdóttir
| imagesize = 250px
| caption = | birth_date = 
| birth_place = Reykjavík, Iceland
| occupation = PoetNovelistPlaywright
| nationality = Icelander
| genre = 
| website = 
}}
Kristín Ómarsdóttir  (born 1962) is an Icelandic author, poet and playwright.

 Biography 

Kristín Ómarsdóttir was born in Reykjavík; she spent her first years in Copenhagen and lived for most of her childhood in Hafnarfjörður. She wrote her first play in 1985, which won her first prize in a playwriting competition run by The National Theater of Iceland.  In 2000, her novel Elskan mín ég dey was nominated for The Nordic Council Literature Prize. In 2005, she won Playwright of the Year at Gríman – The Icelandic Performing Arts Awards. For the poetry book Sjáðu fegurð þína she was awarded Fjöruverðlaunin – the Icelandic Women's Literary Prize in 2008. The poetry book Kóngulær in sýningargluggum, 2017, was nominated to Nordic Counsel Literature Prize in 2019. 
Her most recent novel translated to English is Swanfolk, published in UK and US in July 2022.

 Bibliography 

Novels and stories
==
  Borg bróður míns, 2021
  Svanafólkið, 2019
  Flækingurinn, 2015
  Eternal Reflections   ("Eilífar speglanir" 2013)
  Milla   ("Milla"2012)
  We Belong to the Same Darkness: Marilyn Monroe and Greta Garbo, ("Við tilheyrum sama myrkrinu" 2011)
  By the Bridge   ("Hjá brúnni"  2009)
  A Story of a Small Crybaby   ("Saga af lítilli grenjuskjóðu" 2008)
  Children in Reindeer Woods   ("Hér" 2004)
  Happyness I & II   ("Hamingjan hjálpi mér I og II" 2001)
  My love I Die   ("Elskan mín ég dey" 1997)
  The Narrow Doors   ("Dyrnar þröngu" 1995)
  Black Wedding Dresses   ("Svartir brúðarkjólar" 1991)
  Once Upon a Time Stories   ("Einu sinni sögur" 1991)
  "On A Journey at Yours''   ("Í ferðalagi hjá þér" 1987)

Poetry
  Spiders in Display Windows  ("Kóngulær í sýningargluggum"  2017)
  See Your Beauty  ("Sjáðu fegurð þína"  2008)
  Christmas Poems  ("Jólaljóð"  2006)
  In and Out the Window  ("Inn og útum gluggann" 2003)
  A Special Day  ("Sérstakur dagur" 2000)
  Close Your Eyes and Think of Me  ("Lokaðu augunum og hugsaðu um mig" 1998)
  Waitress at an Old Restaurant  ("þerna á gömlu veitingahúsi"  1993)
  There is Fog in Our House ("Í húsinu okkar er þoka"  1987)

Other Books

  Audition, Gjöf til mín yðar hátign, Stars,  2014

 Theatre and radio drama 
  A Spider Sleeps in the Mirror  ("Í speglingum sefur kónguló"  2011)
  The Big Mermaid  ("Kuðungarnir"  2011)
  Short Stories  ("Smásögur"  2007)
  The Hospital Ship  ("Spítalaskipið"  2004)
  Tell Me Everything  ("Segðu mér allt" 2004)
  My Friend the World's End ("Vinur minn heimsendir"   2003)
  The Birthday-Cake  ("Afmælistertan"  2003)
  Many Women  ("Margar konur" 2000)
  Margarethe the Great Radiodrama  ("Margrét mikla útvarpsverk" 1999)
  Lovestory III  ("Ástarsaga III" 1997)
  Margarethe the Great  ("Margrét mikla" 1995)
  Trumpet of the Heart  ("Hjartatrompet" 1990)
  Dreams Upside Down  ("Draumar á hvolfi" 1987)

 Exhibitions 
  Audition  (In collaboration with Gunnhildur Hauksdóttir, AceArtGallery, Winnipeg, Canada, 2008)
  Gjöf mín yðar hátign  (In collaboration with Gunnhildur Hauksdóttir, Listasafn Así, Reykjavik, 2011)
  Stars  (In collaboration with Gunnhildur Hauksdóttir, The Context Gallery, Derry, Northern Ireland, 2011)

 Translated work 

Danish

 Billie og Rafael, Jensen & Dalgaard, 2015
 Omstrejferen, Jensen & Dalgaard, 2018

English

"Swanfolk"
Harvill Secker, Harper Via Books, 2022Waitress in Fall, Carcanet Press & Partus Press, 2018Children in Reindeer Woods, Open Letter Books, 2012In and Out the WindowPoems in Brushstrokes of Blue: The Young Poets of Iceland

Finnish

Olipa kerran tarinoita, Like, 1994

French

T´es pas la seule à être morte, Le Cavalier Bleu, 2003

Galician

Meu amor, eu morro, rinoceronte, 2015

German

Ewige Speigelungen, 2015

Swedish

Här, Kabusa Böcker, 2007
Gud hjälpe mig I och II, Kabusa Böcker, 2003
Älskling jag dör, Anamma, 1999

References

External links
"Forlagið"
Bokmenntir - on Kristín Ómarsdóttir
Words Without Borders
The City and the Writer
A Saturday Afternoon with Marilyn Monroe and Greta Garbo
Rumpus: Interview with Kristín Ómarsdóttir
Iceland Wikipedia entry

1962 births
Living people
Kristin Omarsdottir
Kristin Omarsdottir